Khaled Naseer is a Saudi Arabian football player who currently plays as a goalkeeper.

References

External links
Profile at Football Database

1989 births
Living people
Saudi Arabian footballers
Al Jandal Club players
Al-Shoulla FC players
Al-Sharq Club players
Al-Anwar Club players
Saudi First Division League players
Saudi Professional League players
Saudi Second Division players
Association football goalkeepers